The Minister of Social Affairs (Faroese language: landsstýrismaðurin í almannamálum, also called Almannamálaráðharrin)  has been a governmental ministerial post since 1968 in the government of the Faroe Islands.

Notes and references 

Faroe Islands
Social